Raymond Stover Fulmer (born February 17, 1933) is an American former actor. He is known for playing the role of Steve Baxter in the final season of the sitcom television series Hazel (1965–1966).

Fulmer was born in Philadelphia, Pennsylvania, and attended Girard College, Penn Charter and Boston College. He was drafted into the U.S. Army in 1953, serving in Germany until 1955. While in the army he became interested in theatre, and after discharge he moved to New York to study at the American Theatre Wing, supporting himself with small roles on television and modelling for fashion advertisements. In 1957 Fulmer joined the cast of the Broadway play Auntie Mame, playing the role of Patrick Dennis. He also appeared in the 1968 Broadway comedy Happiness Is Just a Little Thing Called a Rolls Royce.

Fulmer played Steve Baxter, a real estate agent, husband of Barbara Baxter (Lynn Borden) and father of Susie Baxter (Julia Benjamin) in the final season of Hazel.  After the series ended in 1966, Fulmer played the roles of Lee Gantry in the soap opera Guiding Light and Martin Nell Dillard in Somerset. He retired in 1992, last appearing in the television series The New WKRP in Cincinnati.

References

External links 

Rotten Tomatoes profile

1933 births
Living people
People from Philadelphia
Male actors from Philadelphia
American male television actors
American theatre people
American male stage actors
American soap opera actors
American male soap opera actors
20th-century American male actors